Claypole railway station was a station in Claypole, Lincolnshire that was in operation from 1852 to 1957.

History
The station was opened by the Great Northern Railway (GNR) on 1 August 1852.

The station was closed on 16 September 1957. The present East Coast Main Line still passes through the site, the railway skirting the village on its eastern side.

References

External links
Claypole Station on navigable 1947 O.S. map

Disused railway stations in Lincolnshire
Former Great Northern Railway stations
Railway stations in Great Britain opened in 1852
Railway stations in Great Britain closed in 1957
1852 establishments in England